Howard Brian Goldman (born 1956) is a Canadian emergency physician, author, public speaker, and radio personality.

Education and career 
He completed his undergraduate medical education at the University of Toronto in 1980. In July 1980, he began postgraduate medical education in family medicine. On 15 January 1982, Goldman obtained his Independent Practice Certificate from the College of Physicians and Surgeons of Ontario. He received his certification in family medicine from the College of Family Physicians of Canada (CFPC) in July 1984, followed by a certificate of advanced competency in emergency medicine from the CFPC in November 1985.

He practices in the Schwartz Reisman Emergency Centre at Mount Sinai Hospital in Toronto, Ontario, Canada.

Goldman has been a regular medical columnist on CBC Radio One since 1999.

Goldman was also awarded fellowship in the CFPC, thereby entitled to display the "FCPF" special designation, in addition to his current membership certification in both family medicine and emergency medicine domains, "MCFP (EM)".

Broadcasting 
He also hosts an award-winning current affairs radio series, White Coat, Black Art, on CBC Radio One about the culture of modern medicine and various aspects of the Canadian health care system and is the house Doctor for the Afternoon Edition on CBC Radio One in Saskatchewan. In addition to the series' podcast copy of their content, Dr. Goldman has a concurrent original podcast, The Dose, which has a similar medical theme.

Author 
In 2010, his first book, The Night Shift: Real Life in the Heart of the ER, was published by HarperCollins Canada. The Night Shift is a book on his experiences working the night shift as an emergency physician. His second book, The Secret Language of Doctors  is about slang or argot terms used by doctors, nurses, and other health professionals to talk about patients, unpleasant clinical situations, as well as colleagues.

His third book is The Power of Kindness, 2018, at HarperCollins Canada.

His fourth book is The Power of Teamwork, 2022, at HarperCollins Canada.

Film 
Goldman had a small and uncredited role in the 1971 hit Summer of '42.

References

External links
 CBC Radio's White Coat, Black Art
 CBC's podcast, The Dose 
 TED Talk: Doctors make mistakes. Can we talk about that?
 131: Goldman is probably Canada's best known broadcast journalist on health issues, and a recognized authority in his own right on emergency medicine and pain management. Conference at Hull, QC, 2000/08/14 on APPLICATIONS FOR LICENCES TO OPERATE NEW PAY AND SPECIALTY SERVICES FOR DIGITAL DISTRIBUTION – DEMANDES DE LICENCES VISANT LA DISTRIBUTION NUMÉRIQUE DE NOUVEAUX SERVICES DE TÉLÉVISION SPÉCIALISÉE ET PAYANTE, continuing: Speech of Goldman (no. 132ff.)

20th-century Canadian physicians
21st-century Canadian physicians
Living people
Canadian talk radio hosts
Jewish Canadian writers
Jewish physicians
Physicians from Ontario
University of Toronto alumni
Writers from Toronto
Canadian emergency physicians
1956 births
CBC Radio hosts